KCL or KCl may refer to:

Science and technology
 Potassium chloride (KCl), a metal halide salt
 Keycode lookup, keycode log, or keycode list
 Kirchhoff's current law, in physics
 Kyoto Common Lisp, an implementation of Common Lisp

Other uses
 King's College London, a public research university in London, UK and a constituent college of the University of London